William Browne may refer to:

Government and politics
William Browne (Mayor of the Calais Staple) (1410–1489), Lord Mayor and Merchant of the Staple of Calais, France
Sir William Browne (died 1514), Lord Mayor of London
Sir William Browne (died 1507), Lord Mayor of London
William Browne (MP for Haslemere), English politician who sat in the House of Commons between 1614 and 1622
William Browne (MP for Kerry) (1791–1876), Irish politician in the UK Parliament
William James Browne (1815–1894), pastoralist and politician in South Australia
William Browne (New South Wales politician) (1842–1916), Australian politician
William M. Browne (1827–1883), soldier and cabinet member of the Confederate States of America
William Alfred Browne (1831–after 1897), British civil servant
William Joseph Browne (1897–1989), Newfoundland and Canadian politician
William Browne (Irish politician) (fl. 1930s), Irish Fianna Fáil politician
William Browne (Queensland politician) (1846–1904), gold miner and member of the Queensland Legislative Assembly

Sports
William Browne (cricketer) (1898–1980), Australian cricketer
Willie Browne (1936–2004), Irish football player
Horsey Browne (William F. Browne, 1903–1931), Irish rugby player

Other people
William Browne (poet) (c. 1590–c. 1645), English poet
William Browne (physician) (1692–1774), English physician
William George Browne (1768–1813), British traveller
William Phineas Browne (1804–1869), American lawyer and coal mining pioneer
William A. F. Browne (1805–1885), British psychiatrist
William F. Browne (died 1867), American military photographer
William James Browne (1815–1894), grazier, pastoralist and politician in South Australia
William Rowan Browne (1884–1975), Australian geologist
William Denis Browne (1888–1915), British composer, pianist, organist and music critic (last name is Denis Browne, though he is sometimes incorrectly referred to as "William Browne")
William D. Browne (fl. 1940s), U.S. Army officer who discovered Nazi membership files
William Washington Browne (1849–1897), former slave and Union soldier

See also
William Brown (disambiguation)